Morrison Ranch is a residential district of the city of Agoura Hills, located in the Simi Hills of western Los Angeles County, southern California.

The Lake Lindero neighborhood and the Ventura Freeway (101) are to the south, and Westlake Village on the west.

History
The 1226 home development was threatened by the Woolsey Fire in 2018.

References

Neighborhoods in Agoura Hills, California
Simi Hills
Populated places established in the 1980s